Jane Gilmore Rushing (November 15, 1925 – July 4, 1997) was a Texan novelist and journalist, who used to be a staff writer for the Abilene Reporter-News in Abilene, Texas. Her works are the subject of Jane Gilmore Rushing: A West Texas Writer and Her Work, a book by Lou Halsell Rodenberger, former professor of English at McMurry University in Abilene.

Biography
Rushing grew up in Pyron, a West Texas farming community now recognizable only by a cemetery and railroad sign. From childhood, she wanted to be a writer. In seven novels published between 1963 and 1984, she built her stories around themes that few West Texas writers had dared to tackle. Most of her work centers on cotton farms and early ranches in a land she calls the “too-late frontier”. Her plots explore such sensitive topics as an affair between a mulatto girl and a West Texas cowboy and the painful recognition in an early-nineteenth-century community that one of their own is capable of child and wife abuse. Lou Halsell Rodenberger explores Rushing’s life and discusses in depth her novels and memoir. She finds that although Rushing considered herself a regional writer, her fiction transcends region in illuminating what has motivated and sustained the western frontier’s settlers and their descendants.  In addition to her novels, Rushing co-authored with Kline A. Nall a history of Texas Tech University. Her final book, Starting from Pyron, explores the history and people of the community she grew up in and that inspired her writing.

Rushing, who had lived in Lubbock for most of her career, died of cancer in 1997, at the age of seventy-one. She was survived by her husband Jay (since deceased) and her son, James Arthur, Jr., a German Language professor at Rutgers University.

Books
 Walnut Grove.  Doubleday, New York (1964). OCLC 1379605
 Against the Moon.  Doubleday, Garden City, New York (1968). LCCN 68014166 (Expanded from Rushing's original story published in The Virginia Quarterly Review, 37: 3 (Summer, 1961), 378-383.)
 Geh Schlafen, Mein Herz, es ist Zeit: Familienroman aus Texas.  Christian Wegner Verlag, Hamburg (1969). ASIN B0026O9O50
 Tamzen. Doubleday, Garden City, New York (1972). 
 Mary Dove: A Love Story. Doubleday, Garden City, New York (1974).
 Evolution of a University: Texas Tech's First Fifty Years.  With Kline A. Nall. Madrona Press, Austin, Texas (1975). , 
 The Raincrow.  Doubleday, Garden City, New York (1977).  
 Covenant of Grace: A Novel of Anne Hutchinson.  Doubleday, Garden City, New York (1982). 
 Winds of Blame.  Doubleday, Garden City, New York (1983).  
 Starting from Pyron.  With photographs by Billie Roche Barnard; introduction by A.C. Greene. Texas Tech University Press, Lubbock, Texas (1992). ,

Awards and honors
 Inducted into the Texas Institute of Arts and Letters, 1969.

References

Sources
 Jane Gilmore Rushing: A West Texas Writer and Her Work. By Lou Halsell Rodenberger, Texas Tech University, Lubbock, Texas (2006). 
 Place in the Novels of Jane Gilmore Rushing. by Ariel Durham Peugh, Texas Christian University, Department of English Dissertation (PhD), Fort Worth, Texas (1998).
 Jane Giilmore Rushing, By Cheryl Key and Peggy Scaggs, pages 160-165 in Texas Women Writers: A Tradition of Their Own. Edited by Sylvian Ann Grider and Lou Halsell Rodenberger, Texas A&M University Press, College Station, Texas (1997).  , 
 Jane Gilmore Rushing : social historian of West Texas. By Cheryl Lancaster, Angelo State University, Department of English Thesis (M.A.), San Angelo, Texas (1988). OCLC 21396406
 Gentle Giants: Women Writers in Texas. By Iva Nell Elder, Eakin Press, Austin, Texas, (1983). ,

External links
  Jane Gilmore Rushing: A West Texas Writer and Her Work. By Lou Halsell Rodenberger, Texas Tech University, Lubbock, Texas (2006). Google Books full text.
 Jane Giilmore Rushing, By Cheryl Key and Peggy Scaggs, pages 160-165 in Texas Women Writers: A Tradition of Their Own. Edited by Sylvian Ann Grider and Lou Halsell Rodenberger, Texas A&M University Press, College Station, Texas (1997). Google Books full text.
 Starting from Pyron. With photographs by Billie Roche Barnard; introduction by A.C. Greene. Texas Tech University Press, Lubbock, Texas (1992). Google Books full text.
 Mary Dove: A Love Story. Doubleday, Garden City, New York (1974). Google Books full text.

1925 births
1997 deaths
Writers from Texas
People from Lubbock, Texas
20th-century American women writers